Alloperla is a genus of stoneflies in family Chloroperlidae. It contains the following species:

 Alloperla acadiana
 Alloperla acietata
 Alloperla aracoma
 Alloperla atlantica
 Alloperla banksi
 Alloperla biloba
 Alloperla biserrata
 Alloperla caddo
 Alloperla caudata
 Alloperla chandleri
 Alloperla chloris
 Alloperla coloradensis
 Alloperla columbiana
 Alloperla concolor
 Alloperla continua
 Alloperla cydippe
 Alloperla delicata
 Alloperla erectospina
 Alloperla fidelis
 Alloperla fraterna
 Alloperla furcula
 Alloperla hamata
 Alloperla idei
 Alloperla imbecilla
 Alloperla infuscata
 Alloperla ishikariana
 Alloperla joosti
 Alloperla kurilensis
 Alloperla lateralis
 Alloperla lenati
 Alloperla leonarda
 Alloperla medveda
 Alloperla nanina
 Alloperla natchez
 Alloperla neglecta
 Alloperla nipponica
 Alloperla ouachita
 Alloperla pagmaensis
 Alloperla petasata
 Alloperla pilosa 
 Alloperla roberti
 Alloperla rostellata
 Alloperla serrata 
 Alloperla severa
 Alloperla tamalpa
 Alloperla thalia
 Alloperla thompsoni
 Alloperla usa
 Alloperla voinae
 Alloperla vostoki

Chloroperlidae
Taxonomy articles created by Polbot
Plecoptera genera